Nikli Haor is located in Nikli Upazila, Kishoreganj, Bangladesh. It is about 110 km away from country's capital Dhaka. Apart from Nikli Upazila, the perimeter of this haor extends to the adjoining Mithamain, Austagram and Itna Upazilas. It is one of the largest freshwater wetlands in Bangladesh and also a popular tourist destination. Easy road and rail connectivity with capital Dhaka is one of the reasons for the increase in tourism in this haor. With the establishment of several residential hotels in Nikli, tourists are now getting the benefit of visiting Haor for more than one day. In the monsoon, when this haor is filled with water, the number of tourists increases exponentially.

Citations

Wetlands of Bangladesh
Kishoreganj District